Chingavanam is a suburb of Kottayam city between Kottayam and Changanassery in Kottayam district of Kerala state, India.

History
Before 11th Century, Chingavanam was one of the 28 Karas of Nattakom area which was under the ruling of Munjunaadu Dynasty. In 1103AD, Ilayaraja Vimbileeswaran of Thekkumkur Dynasty conquered Munjunad and Nattakom area became under Thekkumkur ruling. Thekkumkur Royal family(Edathil Family) had Kottarams(Palaces) such as Neerazhi Palace in Changanassery, Vennimala Palace, Edathil Palace in Pallom and Thaliyil Kotta in Thaliyanthanam(Present day Kottayam). Pallathu Kottaram(Edathil Palace) is situated in Pallom near Chingavanam. On September 11th of 1749AD, Ramayyan Dalawa the prime minister of Marthanda Varma conquered Thekkumkur and merged it to the Travancore Kingdom.

Location
Chingavanam is part of the Kottayam Municipality, Kottayam District, situated between Kottayam and Changanacherry. It is about 9 km from both Changanacherry and Kottayam. The Main Central (or M C) road passes through the middle of Chingavanam. Legend has it that the name Chingavanam is derived from Simhavanam, meaning "forest with lions". The nearest Panchayats are Panachikkadu, Kurichy, Neelamperoor and Vakathanam. 

The main religious institutions in Chingavanam is Mor Aprem Seminary, the head office of Knanaya Syrian Jacobite Church and home to the Chief Metropolitan of Knanaya Syrian Jacobite Church, Mor Severios Kuriakose. There are 3 Knanaya churches in Chingavanam; St.John’s Dayara Church, St. John's Puthenpally and St. Mary's Shalem Church. In addition to this, there is also St John's Knanaya Catholic Church and St. John's Cheramer Orthodox Church.

Basis folk stories, this place is named after the famous (but small temple) dedicated to Simhodara Swamy (an associate Lord Shiva) presiding deity of the Parambathu Shiva / Chingavanam Shiva Temple.

Prime Hindu temples are Edanattu Indilayappan Swami Temple, Simhodara Swamy (Shiva) Temple, Arackal Temple, Karimbil Temple, Channanikadu Sree Durga Bhagavathi Temple, Mavilangu Mahalakshmi Temple, Pallom Subramanya Temple and Parambath Siva Temple. SNDP has got its Chingavanam branch and Sree Narayana Guru Temple. The famous pilgrim centre Dakshina Mookambika (Panachikkad Sri Saraswathi Temple) is 7.5KM East of Chingavanam. 

Chingavanam is a hub for many small and medium scale industries - rubber, plywood, swa mills, furniture, workshops and machineries.

Food Corporation of India has got a Food Storage Depot at Pannimattom near Chingavanam. The area is also home to several noted schools including Clemis School, St. Thomas LP & High School, as well as the Government UP school.

Transportation
The nearest local Railway station is Chingavanam and major Railway stations are Kottayam and Changanassery. Nearest Airport is Cochin Nedumbassery Airport. Boat services are available from Kottayam and Changanassery to Alappuzha and other parts of Kuttanad.

Chingavanam is well connected to the rest of Kerala by the M C Road (State High Way 1), connecting Thiruvananthapuram to Muvattupuzha, in Ernakulam District. Chingavanam is connected to Alleppey from Changanassery through A C Road. Chingavanam Railway Station is being developed and will be a future satellite to Kottayam Railway Station. Chingavanam Railway Station is on the Thiruvananthapuram - Kottayam rail route. All major KSRTC buses from Kottayam to Thiruvananthapuram pass through Chingavanam. All KSRTC Buses including Super Fast and Express buses stop in Chingavanam. To high range area of Kottayam can be reached through Vakathanam via Paruthumpara.  The Chennai Changanacherry Inter State bus of SETC connects through Chingavanam.

Nearby cities
Kottayam and Changanacherry are the major towns near Chingavanam. Chingavanam is the main junction for nearby areas such as Panachikad, Paruthumpara, Pannimattom, Neelamperoor, Era, Pallom, Kurichy, Vakathanam, Njaliakuzhy, Pathamuttom and Nattakom.

Notable personalities 
Chingavanam Sisters was a state wide famous Kadhaprasangam troupe in the 1970-1980 period.  

Sri Chingavanam Susheelan Bhagavathar was a well known Carnatic Music maestro and a music trainer to many. He was also known by his expertise in Kalarippayattu, an ancient martial art from South India. The two sisters of the famous Kathaprasangam troupe Chingavanam Sisters were trained by Susheelan Bhagavathar.  

Sri. Pallom Madhavan was a legendary Kadhakali Musician. Initially, he learned Carnatic Music from Pallathu Edathil Kottaram Asthaana Sangeetha Vidwan Sri Rudra Warrier. Later, he learned Kathakali Music from Kurichy Pichakappally Raman Asaan. He joined Kerala Kalamandalam as Kadhakali Music Instructor and retired as Vice Principal of Kerala Kalamandalam in 1989. He visited many countries such as France, Italy, Germany, Russia, Iran, China, Japan, America etc and has performed his art. He has contributed majorly in converting many epics to Kadhakali form. He died in 2012 at his house in Panachikkadu. He was the winner of many awards including Kalamandalam Award, State Kadhakali Award 2011. 

Another well known musician was Sri. V. I. Suku who was the Principal of Thrippunithura RLV College of Music and Fine Arts. 
The famous musicians (fathen son duo) Abhayadev and Ambilikkuttan are from Pallom near Chingavanam.

References  

Villages in Kottayam district